Caleb Timothy Dirks (born June 9, 1993) is an American professional baseball pitcher who is a free agent.

Career

Atlanta Braves
Dirks attended Woodcrest Christian High School and California Baptist University in Riverside, California. In 2014, as a junior at California Baptist, he went 4–1 with a 2.85 ERA in 41 relief innings pitched. He was selected in the 15th round of the 2014 MLB draft by the Atlanta Braves.

After signing with the Braves, Dirks was assigned to the Danville Braves before being promoted to the Rome Braves. In 32.1 relief appearances between the two teams he posted a 1–0 record and 2.23 ERA. He began 2015 with Rome and was promoted to the Carolina Mudcats in May.

On July 2, 2015, the Braves traded Dirks and Jordan Paroubeck to the Los Angeles Dodgers in exchange for an international signing bonus slot worth $249,000. The Dodgers assigned him to the Rancho Cucamonga Quakes and was promoted to the Tulsa Drillers in August. In 40 relief appearances between Danville, Carlolina, Rancho Cucamonga, and Tulsa, he was 3–2 with a 0.90 ERA. Dirks began 2016 with Tulsa.

On June 30, 2016, the Dodgers traded Dirks and Philip Pfeifer to the Braves for Bud Norris, Dian Toscano, a player to be named later (Alec Grosser), and cash. The Braves assigned him to the Mississippi Braves and he finished the season there. In 49 appearances out of the bullpen he was 5–3 with a 1.18 ERA and 1.00 WHIP. Dirks spent 2017 with the Gwinnett Braves where he compiled a 2–2 record and 4.02 ERA in 27 relief appearances. He did not pitch in 2018 due to injury. Dirks began the 2019 season on the injured list, and was subsequently placed on the Florida Fire Frogs roster, where he made his first 2019 season appearances in July. The Braves released Dirks in May 2020.

Eastern Reyes del Tigre
In July 2020, Dirks signed on to play for the Eastern Reyes del Tigre of the Constellation Energy League (a makeshift 4-team independent league created as a result of the COVID-19 pandemic) for the 2020 season.

References

External links

1993 births
Living people
Baseball players from California
People from Arcadia, California
Baseball pitchers
Rome Braves players
Mississippi Braves players
Rancho Cucamonga Quakes players
Tulsa Drillers players
Carolina Mudcats players
Danville Braves players
Gwinnett Braves players
California Baptist Lancers baseball players